Jean-Guy Talbot (born July 11, 1932) is a Canadian former professional ice hockey defenceman and coach.

Career

Playing career
Jean-Guy played in the National Hockey League from 1955 to 1971. During this time, he played for the Minnesota North Stars, Detroit Red Wings, St. Louis Blues, Buffalo Sabres and Montreal Canadiens. While with the Montreal Canadiens, he won seven Stanley Cup championships.

Talbot was well known for being a sound passer. He was also known for having a clean but rather physical style of play (He ended Scotty Bowman’s career with a slash to the head resulting in a fractured skull while in the minors) which ultimately helped Montreal win Stanley Cups. Talbot wore the #17 during his 13 seasons with Montreal.

Over the course of his career he played 1,056 games, scoring 43 goals and adding 242 assists for 285 points. He also collected 1,006 penalty minutes. He was voted a First-Team All-Star in 1961-62 and was selected for six all-star games (1956–57, 1960, 1962, 1965 and 1967).  Talbot was also the player who ended Scotty Bowman's hockey playing career by high sticking/slashing him in the head causing a fractured skull.

Coaching career
Talbot took on the St. Louis Blues head coaching position in 1972, replacing Al Arbour who had been fired from the position. He held the position for two years, resigning in February 1974.
Talbot signed on as head coach for the New York Rangers in 1977, taking over from John Ferguson, with whom he had played during his tenure with the Canadiens. As coach of the Rangers, Talbot was known for wearing a warmup suit behind the bench during games, rather than the normal business suit worn by most coaches.

Coaching record

Personal life
He currently lives in Trois-Rivières, Quebec with his wife of over 70 years. He has two sons, a daughter and five granddaughters.

Awards and accomplishments 
Stanley Cup champion 1956-57-58-59-60-65-66 (all with Montreal)
1961-62 NHL All-Star team (1st)
Played in 1956, 1957, 1960, 1962, 1965 and 1967 NHL All-Star game.

Career statistics

* Stanley Cup Champion.

See also
List of NHL players with 1000 games played

References

External links
 

1932 births
Living people
Buffalo Sabres players
Canadian ice hockey defencemen
Detroit Red Wings players
Ice hockey people from Quebec
Minnesota North Stars players
Montreal Canadiens players
New York Rangers coaches
St. Louis Blues coaches
St. Louis Blues players
Sportspeople from Trois-Rivières
Stanley Cup champions
Canadian ice hockey coaches